Göylər is a village and the most populous municipality, except for the capital Şamaxı, in the Shamakhi Rayon of Azerbaijan. It has a population of 6,844.  The municipality consists of the villages of Göylər Dağ, Göylər Çöl, Acıdərə, and Yenikənd.

References

Populated places in Shamakhi District